Emerald Airlines is an Irish regional airline headquartered in Dublin, on the grounds of Dublin Airport. In August 2021, the airline became the operator of the Aer Lingus Regional franchise, before operations launched on 26 February 2022.

History 
On 6 November 2020, it was reported that Emerald Airlines was bidding to operate the Aer Lingus Regional franchise, with the winning airline to operate flights under the franchise beginning in January 2023. The airline had also submitted an application for an Irish Air Carrier Operating Licence. The following week, it was announced that Aer Lingus had chosen Emerald as the preferred operator of the franchise, with agreements on the deal expected to be finalised in early 2021. Following the June 2021 liquidation of Stobart Air, the previous operator of the Aer Lingus Regional franchise, Emerald Airlines hoped to start operations as early as October 2021, ahead of the original January 2023 operating date. Subsequently, Emerald was officially signed as the Aer Lingus Regional franchise operator in August 2021, and received its air operator's certificate (AOC) in September 2021.

On 17 December 2021, Aer Lingus announced that franchised regional flights operated by Emerald would launch starting on 17 March 2022. Additionally, Emerald established a subsidiary company in Northern Ireland, incorporated as Emerald Airlines UK, and applied for an AOC in the United Kingdom with the UK CAA. On 7 January 2022, it was announced that Emerald had been awarded a PSO contract to operate a route between Donegal and Dublin from 26 February 2022, prior to its original March launch.

Destinations

, Emerald Airlines operates to the following destinations under the Aer Lingus Regional franchise:

Fleet 
, Emerald Airlines operates the following aircraft:

Fleet development 
Emerald's first aircraft order was an agreement to lease six ATR 72-600s from Chorus Aviation on 23 August 2021, which consisted of ATRs formerly operated by Stobart Air and Virgin Australia Regional Airlines. On 4 October 2021, the airline leased an additional four ATR 72-600s from Nordic Aviation Capital.

References 

Airlines of the Republic of Ireland
Airlines established in 2020
2020 establishments in Ireland